Vezham is a 2022 Indian Tamil language romantic thriller film written and directed by Sandeep Shyam. Produced by K4 Kreations, the film stars Ashok Selvan, Janani, and Iswarya Menon in lead roles. Jhanu Chanthar is the music composer of this film who is primarily a guitarist who has played for many composers and a part in various music bands. Cinematographer George C. William’s associate Shakthi Aravind is the cinematographer. The film was released in theatres on 24 June 2022.

Plot
Vezham begins with a series of murders in the Nilgiri Hills. The killing pattern points towards a serial killer on the loose. From there, we randomly move to a romantic song featuring the lead pair, Ashok (Ashok Selvan) and Leena (Iswarya Menon), who share lovely moments in the misty hills. On their way back through the woods, they are attacked. Five years after this horrific incident, Ashok is still reeling in trauma of being the only survivor of the attack. His only purpose in life is to find the killer.
Ashok visits Ooty and stumbles upon killer brothers. Before killing them both, Ashok learns about a contract killer Kaasi, but Kaasi also turns out dead. Ashok persists and finds out that Francis was involved somehow. Ashok confronts Francis and comes to know that Leena kills the rapist of her maid in fit of rage. He turns out to be the minister’s son, who arrange for the contract killing of Leena as a revenge. Ashok goes on a murder spree and kills all of them. Finally Ashok gets to know that all these were orchestrated by Francis to usurp Leena’s wealth and that Leena is in fact alive, married and has a kid. Ashok finally murders Francis too.

Cast

Production
In 2019, the production team announced the principal cast of the film included Ashok Selvan, Janani and Iswarya Menon. Janani reunited with Ashok Selvan which marks their second collaboration after the critically acclaimed movie Thegidi. The team later roped in veteran actors Raja Krishnamoorthy, Sangili Murugan, Marathi actor Padmashree Mohan Agashe and producer P. L. Thenappan. Shyam sundhar, a newcomer who had earlier been part of the director's short film, was also announced as a part of the cast.

Music

The movie's original score is done by Jhanu Chanthar . The film's soundtrack has four songs in varied genres. Dhooram track is written and sung by Pradeep Kumar. Shakthisree Gopalan has sung an enigmatic number Meendum written by Shivam. Debutant Deepika Karthik Kumar has written and sung a romantic number Maarum urave. Pradeep has also sung a sad version of "Dhooram".

Release
The film was released in theatres on 24 June 2022 with the production associating with SP Cinemas for worldwide release.

Reception 
The film was released in theatres on 24 June 2022.M Suganth,  the critic from The Times of India gave 2.5 stars out of 5 and wrote that "But the biggest disappointment is the ineffective antagonists. In fact, the bad guys are one too many and none feel like real threats.".Vignesh Madhu critic from Cinema Express stated that " Vezham also suffers from writing inconsistencies. In the second half, the film has an array of twists"S Subhakeerthana Critic from OTTplay noted that "  What good is a thriller if it doesn’t take you to the edge of the seat and hold you there?" 

However,G Gowtham Critic from India Herald gave mixture of review .Firstpost critic wrote that "Ashok Selvan has essayed the role of Ashok well on screen and has in fact, carried the film on his shoulders"

References

External links
 

2022 films
Indian romantic thriller films
2022 romance films
2022 thriller films